Elena Gorlova (born 13 April 1981) is a Russian Paralympic athlete. She won the bronze medal in the women's club throw F51 event at the 2020 Summer Paralympics held in Tokyo, Japan. She competed at the Summer Paralympics under the flag of the Russian Paralympic Committee.

At the 2019 World Para Athletics Championships held in Dubai, United Arab Emirates, she won the bronze medal in the women's club throw F51 event.

References

External links 
 

Living people
1981 births
Sportspeople from Tashkent
Russian club throwers
Russian female discus throwers
Paralympic athletes of Russia
Athletes (track and field) at the 2020 Summer Paralympics
Medalists at the 2020 Summer Paralympics
Paralympic bronze medalists for the Russian Paralympic Committee athletes
Paralympic medalists in athletics (track and field)
Medalists at the World Para Athletics Championships
Medalists at the World Para Athletics European Championships
21st-century Russian women